Chen Da may refer to:

Chen Da (Water Margin), a fictional character in the Chinese classical novel Water Margin
Chen Da (sociologist) (1892–1975), Chinese sociologist
Chen Da (singer) (1906–1981), Taiwanese folk singer
Chen Da (scientist) (1937–2016), Chinese nuclear scientist